World Famous Gopher Hole Museum is a 2015 Canadian short documentary film directed by Chelsea McMullan and Douglas Nayler. The film centres on the Torrington Gopher Hole Museum in Torrington, Alberta, a museum in which stuffed gophers are posed in various anthropomorphic situations.

The film premiered at the 2015 Toronto International Film Festival.

The film was shortlisted for the Canadian Screen Award for Best Short Documentary at the 4th Canadian Screen Awards.

References

External links

World Famous Gopher Hole Museum at the Canadian Broadcasting Corporation

2015 films
Canadian short documentary films
Films directed by Chelsea McMullan
2010s English-language films
2010s Canadian films
2015 short documentary films